Jorge Gomes Mangrinha Académica Sport Clube do Huambo best known as JGM is an Angolan sports club from the city of Huambo, in the namesake southern province.
In 2016, the club participated for the second consecutive time in the Gira Angola (Angola's second division championship), after winning the Huambo province football championship.

The club is named after its owner, Angolan businessman Jorge Gomes Mangrinha.

Achievements
Angolan League: 0

Angolan Cup: 0

Angolan SuperCup: 0

Gira Angola: 0

Huambo provincial championship: 1
 2015

Recent seasons
J.G.M.'s season-by-season performance:

 PR = Preliminary round, 1R = First round, GS = Group stage, R32 = Round of 32, R16 = Round of 16, QF = Quarter-finals, SF = Semi-finals, RU = Runner-Up, W = Winner

League & Cup Positions

Players and staff

Staff

Manager history

Players

See also
Girabola
Gira Angola

References

External links
 Zerozero.pt profile

External links
 Facebook profile

Football clubs in Angola
Huambo
Association football clubs established in 1998
1990s establishments in Angola